Saikhan-Ovoo may refer to:

 Saikhan-Ovoo, Dundgovi, a sum (district) in central Mongolia
 Saikhan-Ovoo, Bulgan, an urban-type settlement or village in northern Mongolia
 Saikhan-Ovoo coal mine, an underground coal mine in northern Mongolia

See also
 Saikhan (disambiguation)